Paula C. Hollinger (born December 30, 1940, in Washington, D.C.) is a Democratic Party politician from Maryland in the United States.

She most recently served as the associate director for health workforce in the Maryland Department of Health and Mental Hygiene, retiring in 2015.  Until 2007, she served in the Maryland State Senate as a Senate Committee Chair, and was a candidate for Maryland's third congressional district in 2006. The seat was being vacated by Ben Cardin, who was seeking the Democratic nomination for the United States Senate seat being vacated by Senator Paul Sarbanes.  She came in third place in a field of eight other Democrats, garnering 21.3% of the vote.

Hollinger was in the General Assembly for 28 years.  She was elected as a delegate in 1979, and became a state senator in 1986.

Hollinger chaired the Senate Education, Health, and Environmental Affairs Committee in the Maryland General Assembly, serving as the only woman to chair one of the four standing senate committees.

Hollinger is a former nurse, teacher and lecturer. She was a delegate for then Georgia Governor Jimmy Carter at the 1976 Democratic Convention, she also attended the 2000 Democratic Convention as a delegate for former Vice President Al Gore.

Hollinger married her husband, Paul, in 1962.  The couple has three children and seven grandchildren.

See also
Maryland Congressional election, 2006

External links
Hollinger's Maryland General Assembly Website

1940 births
Living people
People from Washington, D.C.
Democratic Party Maryland state senators
Women state legislators in Maryland
21st-century American women